Royal Regatta is a 1966 Soviet comedy film directed by Yuri Chulyukin.

Plot 

A student team is defeated in rowing competitions. The coach decides to leave with the four best rowers. The remaining athletes want to revive the team; they attract a new coach who develops a new technique for them. The team gains the opportunity to compete in an international regatta.

Cast 
 Natalya Kustinskaya as Alyona, a stewardess
 Valentin Smirnitskiy as Vasya
 Aleksandr Gruzinsky as Sexton
 Aleksandr Khanov as Grandfather
 Georgiy Kulikov as Nikolai Lvovich 'Niels Bohr' - a coach
 Vyacheslav Zakharov as Seva - a coxswain
 Aleksandr Potapov as Taras
 A. Martyshkin as Pashka
 Igor Yurash as Anton (as Igor Iurashas)
 Leonid Brusin as Vikentiy (as L. Bruskin)
 Georgiy Svetlani as Gervasiy Fedoseyevich - a sexton (as G. Svetlani)
 Leonid Chubarov
 Klarina Frolova-Vorontsova
 Ervin Knausmyuller as An umpire
 Vladimir Lippart
 Irina Miroshnichenko as Violetta
 Oleg Mokshantsev as Soluyanov - a coach
 Pyotr Repnin
 Janis Sparre as Sports commentator
 Yuriy Tsurilo as Marko (as Yu. Tsurilo)

References

External links 
 

1966 films
1960s Russian-language films
Soviet comedy films
1966 comedy films